Three Springs is a town located  north of Perth, Western Australia on the Midlands Road, which until the opening of the Brand Highway in 1975 was the main road route from Perth to the state's north. The town is the seat of the Shire of Three Springs. Its economy is based on agriculture (mainly broad acre grain cropping and sheep farming) and mining.

History
The first Europeans to pass near the Three Springs area were government Assistant Surveyor Augustus Charles Gregory and Francis Thomas Gregory (both attached to the department of the Surveyor-General) and their brother Henry Churchman Gregory, on a public-private funded expedition to search for new agricultural land beyond the settled areas.
In 1867, government Assistant Surveyor Charles Cooke Hunt, while undertaking a road survey recorded the words "Three Springs" at the site of the current town after some nearby springs. The name began to appear on official maps from then on and land in this region was soon taken up as pastoral leases.

In 1895 the Midland Railway was built under a land grant scheme from Midland Junction to Walkaway. Under the land grant scheme the railway consortium was able to select land within  of the new railway. Three Springs was a siding on the line.
In 1907 the government declared a townsite adjacent to the railway siding, gazetted as Kadathinni in 1908. It was also intended to change the name of the station when the townsite was named, but this was overlooked, and it remained Three Springs. The townsite was also locally known as Three Springs, and in 1946 the name was officially changed to Three Springs to conform with local usage.

In 1932 the Wheat Pool of Western Australia announced that the town would have two grain elevators, each fitted with an engine, installed at the railway siding.

Flora
Banksia trifontinalis (Three Springs Dryandra) is named after the town, in the vicinity of which it was first collected.

Economy

Three Springs' economy is built on mining and agriculture, including broad acre grain cropping and sheep farming, as well as cattle, pigs and wildflower intensive farming.

Imerys S.A. a French industrial minerals company, operates the world's second largest talc mine just outside the Three Springs townsite. Up until 2004, the talc was railed to Geraldton for export. As a result of contamination from iron ore at the port rail unload facility, since 2004 it has been transported by road.

Notable residents
 James “Jimmy” Gardiner (1861-1928) - served as local member in the Legislative Assembly of Western Australia,  colonial treasurer, inaugural state leader of the Country Party, Speaker of the Legislative Assembly, chairman of the Western Australian Cricket Council, president of the Western Australian Cricket Association, founding Vice President of the Kadathinni Cricket Club, Inaugural Patron of the Three Springs Race Club, Inaugural Vice President of the Three Springs Rifle Club.
 Patrick Lynch (1867-1944) - State Minister for Works, federal Minister for Works and Railways, President of the Senate, farmer.

References

External links
 Shire of Three Springs
 Early History of Three Springs
 Three Springs Cemetery
 Biographical Dictionary of Coorow, Carnamah and Three Springs

Mining towns in Western Australia
Towns in Western Australia
Grain receival points of Western Australia
Shire of Three Springs